The 35th G8 summit was held in L'Aquila, Abruzzo, Italy, on 8–10 July 2009. It was originally to be held at Sardinian seaside city of La Maddalena, but it was moved to L'Aquila as part of an attempt to redistribute disaster funds after the devastating earthquake that April.

The locations of previous summits to have been hosted by Italy include: Venice (1980); Venice (1987); Naples (1994) and Genoa (2001). The G8 Summit has evolved beyond being a gathering of world political leaders. The event has become an occasion for a wide variety of non-governmental organizations, activists and civic groups to congregate and discuss a multitude of issues.

Overview
The Group of Seven (G7) was an unofficial forum which brought together the heads of the richest industrialized countries: France, Germany, Italy, Japan, the United Kingdom, the United States and Canada starting in 1976.  The G8, meeting for the first time in 1997, was formed with the addition of Russia. In addition, the President of the European Commission has been formally invited to summits since 1981 and participates in all but political discussion and talks.  The summits were not meant to be linked formally with wider international institutions; and in fact, a mild rebellion against the stiff formality of other international meetings was a part of the genesis of cooperation between France's President Giscard d'Estaing and West Germany's Chancellor Helmut Schmidt as they conceived the initial summit of the Group of Six (G6) in 1975.

The G8 summits during the 21st-century have inspired widespread debates, protests and demonstrations; and the two- or three-day event becomes more than the sum of its parts, elevating the participants, the issues and the venue as focal points for activist pressure.

Leaders at the summit

The 35th G8 summit was the first summit for U.S. President Barack Obama and was the last summit for British Prime Minister Gordon Brown. It was also the first and only summit for Japanese Prime Minister Taro Aso.

Political changes in the G8 member nations were likely to affect the composition of the 35th G8 summit.  France stated it wished China would become a full member by the time of the 37th G8 summit in 2011 was organized as France was the host member. However, this did not happen.  Italian Prime Minister Silvio Berlusconi announced at the press conference at the end of the second day of the Hokkaido summit that the current number of participants would be maintained when the G8 leaders meet in 2009. Berlusconi also explained that a proposal to expand the G8 to include members of the Group of Five (G8+G5) emerging economies – China, India, Mexico, Brazil and South Africa – had not found sufficient support.

Participants
These summit participants were the "core members" of the international forum:

Invited leaders
A number of national leaders are traditionally invited to attend the summit and to participate in some, but not all, G8 summit activities.

The G8 plus the five largest emerging economies are known as G8+5, including:  Brazilian President Luiz Inácio Lula da Silva, Chinese President Hu Jintao, Indian Prime Minister Manmohan Singh, Mexican President Felipe Calderón and South African President Jacob Zuma.  Hu Jintao curtailed his participation following the eruption of ethnic rioting in Ürümqi. In his place, State Councilor Dai Bingguo led the Chinese delegation at the summit.

Previous G8 summits have invited other world leaders to participate; and the Italian duty Presidency invited a number of countries to participate in this summit.

Italy's Berlusconi announced that his country was prepared to host leaders of the G20 on the third day of talks. The proposed purpose was to work towards developing new rules to stop the phenomenon of excessive securitization in the financial system and the use of derivatives that led to the 2008 financial crisis. British Prime Minister Brown supported this proposal.

The Italian presidency of the G8 varies the summit's working methods and the numbers of participants depending on the subject under consideration. This "variable geometry structure" diverges from the traditional G8 format. The involvement of different actors at different stages goes further than the idea of a simple "G8+?". After an initial meeting of the "historic core" leaders of what is understood as the traditional G8), the agenda was broadened and the number of participants was expanded accordingly. The leaders of G8 countries and G5 countries were joined by a delegation from Egypt and a representative group of African countries.

Some suggested that the G8's annual meetings be broadened to include the heads of States or governments of the other countries represented in the governing bodies of the Bretton Woods institutions along with the heads of the main multilateral organizations. This would convert the G8 summits into an informal "global governance council."

Priorities
Traditionally, the host country of the G8 summit sets the agenda for negotiations, which take place primarily amongst multi-national civil servants known informally as "sherpas". Effective organization at the sherpa level is understood to be essential for the success of a summit meeting.

Issues

The summit was intended as a venue for resolving differences among its members. As a practical matter, the summit was also conceived as an opportunity for its members to give each other mutual encouragement in the face of difficult economic decisions.  From Italy's perspective, the important thing is for the evolving G8 to avoid being too closely linked to serial emergency situations when there is no room for discussing broader issues.

The Rambouillet summit in 1975 produced no easy answers to what was then the most serious recession since the  Great Depression of the 1930s; but the main themes of what is now considered the 1st G8 summit have persisted at the top of the world's agenda—avoiding protectionism, energy independence, and boosting growth.  However, the plausibly prescient British Secretary of State for Business, Enterprise and Regulatory Reform Peter Mandelson, speaking in 2009, expressed the opinion that "however long it might persist as a grouping, as a steering committee for the global economy, the era of the G8 is over". Mandelson's comment comes during a trip to Sao Paulo, Brazil.

Schedule and Agenda
Before the summit, Italian Prime Minister Berlusconi explained that the schedule of meetings would be very much like that of the Hokkaido summit,
"My opinion is that it is best to keep together countries which share the same principles and I suggested that in 2009 the first day of the summit should see just the G8 meet.  On the second day the table can be expanded in the morning to include the G5, with the G8+5 also discussing Africa, while the G8 would then meet alone in the afternoon to draw their conclusions.  This program was unanimously accepted and will be used at the G8 summit in Italy."

The agenda for the 35th G8 summit included some issues which remain unresolved from previous summits.  The process of finalizing the agenda moved forward when Berlusconi's began contacting his G8 counterparts shortly after Italy took over the rotating presidency on January 1, 2009.  At this point, the Italian premier's office announced that Italy, as G8 host country, was planning to focus its initiatives on the economy, energy issues, sustainable development and climate change.  Other issues on the agenda might encompass disarmament, the fight against terrorism and peace efforts in world hot spots.  Global health issues and food were also proposed as suitable topics for discussion at the summit.  Global health was first introduced as an agenda item nine years ago at the 26th G8 summit in 2000.

On the G8 agenda:
 Climate change.
 Energy; Nuclear energy.
 Dialogue with emerging countries.
 Achievement of millennium development goals.
 Negotiations on climate change.
 Development of Africa – 4 issues (alimentation, global health, water, education) or education, water, food and agriculture, peace support.
 Intellectual property.
 Heiligendamm Process.
 Outreach and expansion.

Infrastructure Consortium of Africa
The G8 leaders discussed a range of issues relating to African development.  Africa, which has been on the G8 agenda since 2000, has continued to lag behind on progress towards meeting Millennium Development Goals (MDGs).  In February 2009, Margaret Chan, head of the WHO, emphasized the importance of meeting the modest goals which were discussed and adopted in previous G8 summit discussions.

The Infrastructure Consortium for Africa (ICA) was established at the 31st G8 summit at Gleneagles, Scotland in the United Kingdom in 2005. Since that time, the ICA's annual meeting is traditionally hosted by the country holding the Presidency of the G8. The 2008 meeting was held in Tokyo in March 2008, and the 2009 meeting took place in mid-March in Rome.

Environment and Climate change
The G8 leaders discussed a range of issues relating to climate in the context of a framework established at the 2007 United Nations Climate Change Conference held in Bali, Indonesia.

In the final documents the heads of State and Government, decided also to endorse one of the main achievements of the previous G8 environment ministers meeting, held in Siracusa (Sicily) in April 2009, the Carta di Siracusa on Biodiversity, establishing the global major priorities in that field and the road map for the future.

Nuclear Security pre-summit

In a series of related statements, G8 leaders endorsed the strategy and a "Global Summit on Nuclear Security" in March 2010, that President Obama proposed on the first day of the summit, committing to "reducing and eventually eliminating existing nuclear arsenals; strengthening the Nuclear Non-Proliferation Treaty and stopping the spread of nuclear weapons to additional nations; and preventing terrorists and political extremists from obtaining nuclear weapons or materials."

Citizens' responses and authorities' counter-responses

Protesters and demonstrations
Protest groups and other activists were expected to make a showing at the summit. Forward planning for this and future G8 summits began in advance of the 2008 Hokkaido summit. Activist organizations anticipated that early planning can result in greater networking effectiveness for G8 summits. The 2009 summit attracted significant focus for development campaigners in G8 countries and elsewhere in Europe including the regional GCAP Europe. Collective campaigning ahead of the European Parliament elections was also anticipated to generate momentum on global issues ahead of July 2009.

In 2008, a number of commemorative events were organized to mark the seventh anniversary of demonstrations at the Genoa G8 summit; and the occasion included a call for people to participate in preparations for protests at the 2009 G8 summit.

Anti-poverty charities were keen to make sure pressure is kept up to ensure that the G8 sticks to the aid promises they made in 2005, thanks to the massive Make Poverty History Campaign. However some who were involved in Make Poverty History, such as the Jubilee Debt Campaign, lost patience with the G8 and began to argue that only through its abolition will global solutions to poverty and climate change be found.

Citizen journalism
Citizens' groups are expected to organize citizen journalism centers to provide independent media coverage of the G8 summit and the expected protests. In a sense, this article will evolve as the work product of something like citizen journalism, growing through serial draft texts as part of "the first rough draft of history."

Security
In light of violent events at the Genoa summit, security will be one of the key indices for measuring the success of the L'Aquila summit.  In a December 2008 press conference, Prime Minister Berlusconi addressed this issue explicitly: "Given the traumatic experience of Genoa ... for us the problem of security is a real one. The previous government picked La Maddalena thinking, I believe, that this location would be ideal to avoid a repeat of what happened in Genoa."

Italian authorities anticipate 25,000 people attending the summit, including 4,500 delegates, 4,500 journalists and a large number of security forces.

The Government has put into place 15 000 police officers from Carabinieri, Polizia, Guardia di Finanza along with Army, the Air Force and the Marine.

Budget
Although the Italian Government insists the summit's moving will help restore normality and provide much-needed funding to devastated L'Aquila, it remains to be seen how it can justify the costs involved with preparing the original site for its years-in-the-making facelift.

Part of the cost of creating the original facilities for the 2009 summit were merged in the costs of transforming the former U.S. Navy submarine base at Punta Rossa into a tourist and vacation destination.  This harbor has been an Italian naval base since 1887; but the area was bombed extensively in World War II; and some of work involves restoration as well as renewal. The Arsenale marittimo (maritime arsenal) has been converted to a new use as a conference center; and the military hospital has been reconfigured for use as a hotel. From the beginning of the conversion's design stage, planning focused on potential uses which could be anticipated after the end of the G8 summit.

At the end of the 2009 summit, La Maddalena's facilities and amenities were to be made available for tourist accommodations, and the conference spaces will be available for booking. The harbor's reconstructed quays, moorings and amenities will become a new Mediterranean port of call just north of the exclusive Costa Smeralda of eastern Sardinia.

The infrastructure investment which resurfaces and extends the length of the nearby airport's runways will also upgrade the facility for increased tourism traffic after the summit leaders have left the island.

Business opportunity
For some, the G8 summit becomes a profit-generating event; as for example, the G8 Summit magazines which have been published under the auspices of the host nations for distribution to all attendees since 1998.
Call girl ring ‘of 350 women’ linked to alleged corruption over Rome G8 contracts

Gallery

See also

 International Panel on Climate Change
 United Nations Framework Convention on Climate Change

Notes

References
 Architetto Frau:  "Esperti Maddalena pronti a collaborare a lavori per vertice G8," Italy Global Nation (IGN). July 21, 2008.
 Reinalda, Bob and Bertjan Verbeek. (1998).  Autonomous Policy Making by International Organizations. London: Routledge.  ; ;   OCLC 39013643

External links

Other WIKI articles about the Group of 8
 Official 35th G8 website: La Maddalena summit, 2009; n.b., no official website is created for any G7 summit prior to 1995 – see the 21st G7 summit.
 University of Toronto: G8 Research Group, G8 Information Centre
  G8 2009, pre-summit developments

2009
2009 in Italy
Diplomatic conferences in Italy
21st-century diplomatic conferences (Global)
G8 summit
G8 summit
L'Aquila
21st century in Abruzzo
July 2009 events in Europe